The Women's World Chess Championship was held from 16 March to 7 April 2015 in Sochi, Russia. It was a 64-player knockout tournament. It was originally scheduled from 11 to 31 October 2014 but problems in finding a sponsor and host city eventually forced international chess organisation FIDE to announce the postponement of the Championship on 24 September 2014, scheduling it for early 2015 in Sochi. The unclear state of the tournament was highly criticised by the Association of Chess Professionals (ACP).

In the final, Ukrainian Mariya Muzychuk, seeded 8th, defeated Russian Natalia Pogonina, seeded 31st. As a result of this victory, Muzychuk was awarded the title of Grandmaster (GM), qualified for the FIDE World Cup 2015, and earned the right to defend her title in a 2016 match against the winner of the Women's FIDE Grand Prix Series 2013-14, Hou Yifan.

Participants

The players were selected through national chess championships, zonal tournaments and continental chess championships. 51 players from women's continental and zonal qualifiers: Europe 28, Asia 12, Americas 8 and Africa 3.

The qualified players were announced on 22 January 2015, subject to signing the contract.

Three former world champions were in the field: Alexandra Kosteniuk seeded 5th, Antoaneta Stefanova 9th and Anna Ushenina 15th. Notably, women's world number one and defending champion Hou Yifan from China opted not to play, because of a prior commitment to a chess tournament in Hawaii. Also absent from the world top-10 were Nana Dzagnidze and Kateryna Lagno (they were replaced by two spots from E13).

The participating players were seeded by their FIDE rating of March 2015.

 , GM, 2581 (R)
 , GM, 2557 (WC)
 , GM, 2552 (E12)	
 , GM, 2530 (E12)
 , GM, 2529 (E12)
 , GM, 2528 (E12)
 , GM, 2527 (R)
 , IM, 2526 (R)	
 , GM, 2522 (R)
 , GM, 2513 (E12)
 , GM, 2495 (E13)
 , GM, 2492 (WC)
 , GM, 2488 (E12)
 , WGM, 2487 (R)
 , GM, 2486 (WC)
 , IM, 2484 (PN)
 , GM, 2483 (E12)
 , GM, 2482 (E12)
 , IM, 2481 (E12)
 , IM, 2479 (R)
 , GM, 2477 (Z2.1)
 , GM, 2475 (E12)
 , WGM, 2473 (AS13)
 , GM, 2471 (PN)	
 , GM, 2463 (E13)
 , IM, 2459 (E12)
 , WGM, 2459 (E13)
 , IM, 2459 (Z3.5)
 , IM, 2457 (E12)
 , WGM, 2456 (J13)
 , WGM, 2456 (E12)
 , WGM, 2444 (Z3.5)
 , WGM, 2444 (Z2.4)
 , IM, 2443 (J12)
 , IM, 2443 (E13)
 , IM, 2438 (E13)
 , IM, 2436 (E13)
 , IM, 2419 (E13)
 , IM, 2415 (AS12)
 , IM, 2395 (E13)
 , IM, 2384 (E13)
 , WGM, 2381 (E12)
 , GM, 2379 (E13)
 , IM, 2377 (E13)
 , IM, 2374 (E13)
 , IM, 2367 (E13)
 , WGM, 2365 (Z3.5)
 , WGM, 2354 (Z3.7)
 , IM, 2349 (Z2.5)
 , WGM, 2349 (Z3.5)
 , WGM, 2337 (Z3.4)
 , WGM, 2322 (Z2.3)
 , WGM, 2322 (Z2.1)
 , WIM, 2302 (Z3.1)
 , WGM, 2284 (E13)
 , WIM, 2267 (Z2.2)
 , WGM, 2261 (Z3.3)
 , WIM, 2219 (AM)
 , WGM, 2192 (Z2.1)
 , IM, 2182 (Z3.6)
 , WIM, 2130 (Z3.2)
 , WIM, 2071 (AF)
 , WGM, 2058 (AF)
 , WIM, 2022 (AF)

Qualification paths 

WC: Semi-finalists of the Women's World Chess Championship 2012 and runner-up of 2013
J12 and J13: World Junior Champions 2012 and 2013
R: Rating (average of all published ratings from February 2013 to January 2014 was used) (5)
E12 and E13: European Individual Championships 2012 and 2013 (28)
AM: American Continental Chess Championship 2014

AS12 and AS13: Asian Chess Championships 2012 and 2013
AF: African Chess Championship 2013 (3)
Z2.1 (3), Z2.2, Z2.3, Z2.4, Z2.5, Z3.1, Z3.2, Z3.3, Z3.4, Z3.5 (4), Z3.6, Z3.7: Zonal tournaments
PN: FIDE President nominee (2)

Nationalities in the field
Russia sent the most players with ten, one more than China.
Note that 26 of the players came from countries which were former Soviet republics.

Schedule and prize money

Two days per match were followed by possible tie-breaks on the next day if the match was tied. The only rest day was 1 April the day after the semi-finals.

The total prize-money was 450,000 US dollars, the same as in 2010 and 2012.

Results

Final match

The final was the only match of the tournament which consisted of four classical games (from 2 to 5 April 2015), played on consecutive days with a rest-day between the semi-final tie-breaks and match 1. Eventual tie-breaks, if needed, were scheduled to play on 6 April 2015, in the same manner as the whole tournament: two rapid games (25+10), i.e. 25 minutes for the whole game plus 10 seconds increment, the two rapid games (10+10), two blitz games (5+3) and an armageddon decider.

Pogonina had the white pieces in the first game. Before the final they had met only once, in the 2007 European Individual Chess Championship, which ended in a draw.

In the final game 4, white pieces belonged to Muzychuk, who opened the game with her favorite 1.е4. Pogonina responded with her favorite 1...е5. In the Scotch Four Knights Game she tried to avoid the main variations by putting the bishop to b4 via c5. The idea allowed Black to duck the home preparation of Muzychuk. White, however, achieved a spatial advantage and overall more favorable game after the opening. Later White decided to advance kingside pawns, weakening own king. The Black also had pawn weaknesses and a sharp and dynamically balanced position emerged. On the move 41 Muzychuk carried out a simplifying combination, transposing to an endgame with two strong passed pawns against a knight. Pogonina was left with no winning chances, and the game ended in a draw on the move 56 after the move repetition.

{| class="wikitable" style="text-align:center"
|+Women's World Chess Championship Final 2015
|-
! !! Rating !! style="width:2em;"|1 !! style="width:2em;"|2 !! style="width:2em;"|3 !! style="width:2em;"|4 !! Total
|-
| align=left |  ||2526 || style="background:black; color:white"| ½ || 1 ||style="background:black; color:white"| ½ || ½ || 2½
|-
| align=left | ||2456 || ½ ||style="background:black; color:white"| 0 || ½ ||style="background:black; color:white"| ½ || 1½
|}

Bracket
Players were seeded by their March rating. The standard bracket is used, i.e. seed #1 plays #64, #2 plays #63 and so on. The draw of who plays white first is done at the opening ceremony. Pairings published on 3 March.

References

External links
Official website
Regulations, etc

Women's World Chess Championships
2015 in chess
2015 in Russian women's sport
Sports competitions in Sochi
International sports competitions hosted by Russia
Chess in Russia
21st century in Sochi
March 2015 sports events in Russia
April 2015 sports events in Russia
Women's sports competitions in Russia